Images of Organization is a bestseller book by Gareth Morgan, professor of organizational behavior and industrial relations at the Schulich School of Business at York University in Toronto, which attempts to unveil organization via a number of metaphors. It was first published in 1986.

The book particularly describes the organization as (1) machines, (2) organisms, (3) brains, (4) cultures, (5) political systems, (6) psychic prisons, (7) flux and transformation, and (8) instruments of domination.

References
A review of Images of Organization by Matthew J. Lambert III, Complicity: An International Journal of Complexity and Education Volume 6 (2009), Number 2 • pp. 156–158.

External links
Images of Organization: Table of Contents

Business books
2007 non-fiction books